Deporaus betulae is a species of European weevil that feeds on birches (Betula spp.).  It belongs to the family Attelabidae and tribe Deporaini.

References

External links
 
 
 SkogsSkada, SLU

Attelabidae